Cobra Sports Club, commonly known as Cobra Sport, are a South Sudanese basketball team based in Juba, South Sudan. The team was established in 2017 and plays in the Central Equatoria State Basketball Association (CESBA). Cobra has won three national championships.

Cobra played in the Basketball Africa League (BAL) during the 2022 season.

History
The sports club was founded in 2014 by Biardit Company Limited. The basketball team was established in 2017.

In 2020, Cobra played in its first continental games when it participated in the qualifiers for the 2020 BAL season. Cobra played in Group F in Antananarivo and ended in third place, missing out on advancing to the next round. However, the club advanced with a wild card before losing all next three games in the Elite 16 stage. 

On 20 September 2021, Cobra signed John Jevish Omondi from Kenya as their new head coach. The team played in the 2022 BAL qualification for a second straight season. In the first round, the team lost both its games but managed to advance with a wild card given by FIBA. Ahead of the second round, the team acquired Kenyan international Tom Wamukota and Rwandan international Dieudonné Ndizeye. With its strengthened roster, Cobra managed to advance to the semi-finals after defeating Ulinzi Warriors in the second round. On December 10, 2021, Cobra defeated New Star and claimed a spot in the regular season of the 2022 BAL season. The team became the first-ever team from South Sudan to qualify for the BAL.

Honours
CESBA
Champions (3): 2018, 2019, 2021–22
The NBA Legend Manute Bol Cup
Winners (1): 2019

In the Basketball Africa League

Players

Current roster 
The following is the Cobra Sport 13-man roster for the 2022 BAL season group phase:

Notable players

 Tony Marino Anthony
 Samir Loduo
 Alex Tombe
 Nyang Wek
 Tom Wamukota
 Dieudonné Ndizeye

References

External links
Cobra Sports Club at Facebook

Basketball teams in South Sudan
Basketball teams established in 2017
Juba
Basketball Africa League teams
Road to BAL teams

https://instagram.com/cobra_south_sudan?igshid=YmMyMTA2M2Y=  at [Istagram]